Eric Lutes (born August 19, 1962) is an American actor, known for his roles as Del Cassidy on Caroline in the City, Jerry Stanton in Switching Goals, and Jake Carlson on So Little Time (which starred both Mary-Kate Olsen and Ashley Olsen). His career started with several commercial spots. He then moved to New York City and appeared in many off-Broadway productions before finally making the move to Los Angeles, where he landed a role on Caroline in the City. He also played the KACL station manager Tom Duran in the second season of Frasier and has appeared in numerous TV movies.

Lutes was born in Woonsocket, Rhode Island, and raised in Charlestown, Rhode Island, the son of Claire, a psychiatric nurse and astrologer, and John Lutes, an artist.

Filmography

Film

Television

References

External links

1962 births
Living people
People from Woonsocket, Rhode Island
American male television actors
Male actors from Rhode Island